Old Ford is a place within the London Borough of Tower Hamlets. A number of artificial waterways cross the district.

Old Ford Lock could refer to:
Old Ford Lock on the Lee Navigation
Old Ford Lock (Regent's Canal)
Old Ford Three Locks on the Hertford Union Canal
Old Ford Tidal Lock (defunct) on the Old River Lea